Nossa Senhora do Livramento may refer to the following places:

Nossa Senhora do Livramento, Mato Grosso, Brazil
Nossa Senhora do Livramento, Cape Verde